Michael Matsentides (April 11, 1980) is a Greek-Cypriot professional basketball coach and current Head Coach of Omonia Nicosia and Assistant Coach of Cyprus national team

Club coaching career 
After having previously worked as the assistant coach of  ENAD BC, ETHA and APOEL, Matsentides became the assistant coach of Keravnos in 2011 where he won 2 super cup, 2 cups and 2 championships.
From 2022 he is the Head coach of Omonia Nicosia

In 2019, he was hired by the Al Riyadi Beirut as an assistant coach.

Cypriot national team 
Matsentides has also worked as an assistant coach of the senior Cyprus women's team between 2012 and 2017 and between 2012 and 2017 he was head coach of Cyprus youth national teams, Since 2017 until now, Matsentides is the head coach of Cyprus U16 Boys team  and in 2019 he was named assistant coach of Cyprus men's team.

References

External links 

 Asia-basket Profile
 FIBA Europe Coaching Profile

Living people

APOEL B.C. coaches
Keravnos B.C. coaches

1980 births

People from Nicosia